Corneodermatosseous syndrome is an autosomal dominant condition with onset in infancy, characterized by corneal dystrophy, photophobia, diffuse palmoplantar keratoderma, distal onycholysis, skeletal abnormalities, with brachydactyly, short stature, and medullary narrowing of digits.

See also
 Palmoplantar keratoderma
 Keratoderma
 Skin lesion
 Terminal osseous dysplasia with pigmentary defects
 List of cutaneous conditions

References

External links 

Palmoplantar keratodermas
Syndromes affecting the cornea
Syndromes with short stature
Syndromes with dysmelia